Quentin Oyamo Westberg (born April 25, 1986) is a soccer player who plays as a goalkeeper for Atlanta United. Born in France, Westberg opted to represent the United States on the international level and is a former youth international having represented the team at under-17 and under-20 level, whom he played with at the 2005 FIFA World Youth Championship.

He is a graduate of the Clairefontaine academy and previously served as the number one goalkeeper for Troyes.

Club career

Early career
Westberg was born in Suresnes, a commune in the western suburbs of Paris, to an American father and a French mother. Westberg initially started his football career with FC Saint-Cloud located not far from his hometown. He later had a stint at first division club Paris Saint-Germain training at the Camp des Loges before moving on to FC Issy-les-Moulineaux in southwest Paris. After a year at the club, Westberg was selected to attend the prestigious Clairefontaine academy after successfully passing the entrance exams required to attend. While attending the academy, he was a part of “A la Clairefontaine”, a documentary series by Bruno Sevaistre which chronicled the lives of the France's top young footballers during their time at the academy. After leaving the academy, Westberg signed youth papers with then-Ligue 1 club Troyes AC.

Troyes
Westberg spent approximately four years in the club's youth academy before being promoted to the senior team for the 2006–07 season. On October 21, 2006, he made his professional debut in a league match against Valenciennes appearing as a substitute in the fifty-first minute for the injured Ronan Le Crom with the match drawn at 1–1. Westberg conceded two goals resulting in Troyes losing the match. The following week, Westberg started against Saint-Étienne and earned his first career victory conceding only one goal in a 3–1 win. That would be his only two appearances of the season with Troyes suffering relegation to Ligue 2.

Due to his limited opportunities, in the off-season, Westberg pondered departing the club either through a loan deal or a definitive transfer. However, he committed to the club, who were now playing in Ligue 2. The new season saw Westberg handed the number 1 shirt and designated as the team's goalkeeper for cup matches. He earned his first career clean sheet in a 2–0 victory over Gueugnon in the Coupe de la Ligue on August 28, 2007. The following month, Troyes were eliminated from the competition after losing 1–0 to Nice with Westberg playing the full 90 minutes. In the Coupe de France, Troyes, with Westberg in goal, earned victories over amateur clubs Forbach (1–0) and Jarville (3–1) in the 7th and 8th round, respectively. In the following round against Montpellier, Westberg was replaced by domestic starter Cyrille Merville. Despite the shift, Troyes lost the match 1–0. Westberg's only appearance domestically came on the final match day of the season in an embarrassing 5–0 loss to Guingamp.

Westberg remained Troyes' domestic cup keeper for the 2008–09 season as he remained second fiddle to Merville in league play. Westberg performed well in the Coupe de France recording one clean sheet and helping Troyes reach the Round of 32 where the club was upended by Rodez. In the Coupe de la Ligue, the team, with Westberg in goal, reached the third round before losing to Metz. The club's positive performances in the cup competitions were overwhelming compared to its negative performance domestically as the club suffered relegation to the Championnat National, the third division of French football. With the club now semi-professional, a host of veterans departed the club, which included Merville, who joined Arles-Avignon. Due to Merville's departure, Westberg was finally handed the starting goalkeeper spot. In the 2009–10 season, Westberg performed well appearing in 32 of the 38 league matches contested conceding only 25 goals, which was second best among the league's starting goalkeepers. Following the season, in which Troyes earned promotion back to Ligue 2, Westberg was not re-signed to a new deal and departed the club after playing through the duration of his contract.

Évian

On September 23, 2010, Ligue 2 club Évian Thonon Gaillard confirmed on its website that the club had signed Westberg. Prior to signing with the club, Westberg had been training with the reserve team of his former club Troyes in order to maintain his fitness. He made his debut four days later in a league match against Boulogne. On January 9, 2011, Westberg started in goal in Évian's 3–1 upset victory over the defending league champions Marseille in the Coupe de France.

On 20 May, he was in goal during a 1–2 away victory at Stade de Reims which saw his team gaining promotion to Ligue 1.

Sarpsborg 08
On March 29, 2015, Tippeligaen club Sarpsborg 08 confirmed the contract.

Tours FC
On July 22, 2015, Westberg signed with Ligue 2 side Tours FC.

Toronto FC
After two and a half years with AJ Auxerre, he moved to Toronto FC in February 2019. Initially signed to be the backup goalkeeper to Alex Bono, he quickly won the starting role, earning a two-year contract extension with an option for a third, in January 2020. In December 2021 Toronto picked up Westerberg's contract option, keeping him through 2022. After the end of the 2022 season, he departed the club, upon the expiry of his contract.

Atlanta United
On December 23, 2022, it was announced that Westberg would join MLS side Atlanta United for their 2023 season.

International career
Though born in France, Westberg opted to represent the United States. Westberg's father, an American, reached out to the United States Soccer Federation, which led to the federation sending scouts John Hackworth and Peter Mellor of the United States under-17 team to watch him. Westberg made his first major tournament appearance with the under-17 team at the 2003 FIFA U-17 World Championship, held in Finland, where he served as backup keeper to Phil Marfuggi. The United States reached the quarter-finals, where they lost 0–3 to Brazil. Westberg's only appearance in the competition was in an 0–2 defeat to Spain, in which he allowed goals from Cesc Fàbregas and Jurado.

Honors
Toronto FC
Canadian Championship: 2020

References

External links
 

1986 births
Living people
Sportspeople from Suresnes
French people of American descent
American soccer players
French footballers
Association football goalkeepers
INF Clairefontaine players
ES Troyes AC players
Thonon Evian Grand Genève F.C. players
Luzenac AP players
Sarpsborg 08 FF players
Tours FC players
AJ Auxerre players
Toronto FC players
Atlanta United FC players
Ligue 2 players
Ligue 1 players
United States men's youth international soccer players
United States men's under-20 international soccer players
United States men's under-23 international soccer players
Major League Soccer players
Footballers from Hauts-de-Seine